Skyview Ranch is a residential neighbourhood in the northeast quadrant of Calgary, Alberta, Canada. Located near the north edge of the city, it is bounded by Métis Trail N.E. to the west, the Redstone community to the north, 60 Street N.E. to the east, and the Cityscape community to the south. It is bisected by Country Hills Boulevard, which becomes Highway 564 to the east.

Skyview Ranch is located within Calgary City Council's Ward 5.

Demographics 

See also 
List of neighbourhoods in Calgary

References 

Neighbourhoods in Calgary